Cumberland City is a town in Stewart County, Tennessee. The population was 311 at the 2010 census. It is part of the Clarksville, TN — Kentucky Metropolitan Statistical Area.

Cumberland City is the site of a TVA Cumberland Fossil Plant along the Cumberland River that provides 2.6 gigawatts of electric power to much of the area, including the cities of Clarksville in Montgomery County and Dickson in Dickson County.

Geography
Cumberland City is located at  (36.390469, -87.640801).

There is an impact crater centered at Wells Creek, just south of the Cumberland Fossil Plant.

Demographics

2020 census

As of the 2020 United States census, there were 305 people, 148 households, and 64 families residing in the town.

2000 census
As of the census of 2000, there were 316 people, 139 households, and 89 families residing in the town. The racial makeup of the town was 87.34% White, 7.91% African American, 0.63% Asian, 2.22% from other races, and 1.90% from two or more races. Hispanic or Latino of any race were 2.22% of the population.

There were 139 households, out of which 24.5% had children under the age of 18 living with them, 43.2% were married couples living together, 14.4% had a female householder with no husband present, and 35.3% were non-families. 29.5% of all households were made up of individuals, and 17.3% had someone living alone who was 65 years of age or older. The average household size was 2.27 and the average family size was 2.80.

In the town, the population was spread out, with 22.5% under the age of 18, 10.1% from 18 to 24, 23.4% from 25 to 44, 22.5% from 45 to 64, and 21.5% who were 65 years of age or older. The median age was 40 years. For every 100 females, there were 91.5 males. For every 100 females age 18 and over, there were 88.5 males.

The median income for a household in the town was $21,750, and the median income for a family was $26,250. Males had a median income of $31,875 versus $17,500 for females. The per capita income for the town was $14,363. About 22.8% of families and 27.3% of the population were below the poverty line, including 37.9% of those under the age of 18 and 23.8% of those 65 and older.

Media
Radio Stations
 WTPR-FM 101.7 - "The Greatest Hits of All Time"
 WTPR-AM 710 - "The Greatest Hits of All Time"

References

Towns in Stewart County, Tennessee
Towns in Tennessee
Clarksville metropolitan area